Hendrella kermanensis is a species of tephritid or fruit flies in the genus Hendrella of the family Tephritidae.

Distribution
Iran.

References

Tephritinae
Insects described in 2017
Diptera of Asia